Sister is the debut album by Japanese alternative rock band Marbell. It was released in Japan on May 14, 2008. The album is Marbell's solitary release as they officially disbanded in March 2010. Music videos were produced for "Miss All Birthday" and "Te no Naru Kata e".

Track listing

References 

2008 albums